Hans Stetter (16 August 1927 in Cologne, Germany – 29 January 2019) was a German television actor.

Filmography

References

External links

Doris Mattes Agency 

1927 births
2019 deaths
German male television actors
Actors from Cologne